Noam Jenkins is a Canadian actor, voice actor, and television director. He is best known for his portrayal as Aiden Pearce in the 2014 video game Watch Dogs, and Detective Jerry Barber on Global's Rookie Blue.

Filmography

Video games

External links

Year of birth missing (living people)
Living people
Canadian male television actors
Canadian male film actors
Place of birth missing (living people)
Canadian male voice actors
Canadian male video game actors